Julie Haye is a fictional character in the BBC soap opera EastEnders played by Karen Henthorn between 15 September 1997 and 30 April 1998. Julie was a love interest for the popular character Nigel Bates (Paul Bradley). After "a whirlwind affair", the couple leave the soap together for a new life in Scotland.

Storylines
Julie Haye is the teacher of Clare Bates (Gemma Bissix). She is first seen at a parent-teacher meeting in September 1997, where she informs Clare's guardian, Nigel Bates (Paul Bradley), that Clare is associating with a gang of bullies. Clare is initially against Julie's interference, but with Nigel's help, the bullying is eventually curtailed. Julie occasionally visits Nigel's video shop to rent French films, and they become friends. Julie intends to put on a play about the history of Walford and persuades Nigel to help organise it. The play prompts local interest and everyone wants to be involved. Julie kisses Nigel one night after a play committee meeting, but Nigel does not reciprocate, so she is embarrassed. Meanwhile, Clare has begun dating a fellow pupil at her school named Josh Saunders (Jon Lee), who is Julie's son. Julie is divorced from Josh's father Eliot Saunders (Lawrence Lambert), and uses her maiden name so Josh will not be bullied by other pupils. Eliot is unhappy that Julie is planning to take Josh to live in Scotland, which also saddens Nigel. Regretting his prior reticence, Nigel asks Julie to dinner. Their date goes well and they end the evening with a kiss.

Julie's play rehearsals go ahead amidst many problems, mainly concerning casting, as everyone wants the best roles. She also manages to offend Nigel when she recasts his role to Alex Healy (Richard Driscoll). Nigel begins to think that Julie does not reciprocate his feelings, but after much moping Julie reassures him that she really is interested, and invites herself to stay the night at his house. However, the following day, the rose bush that Nigel planted in his dead wife's honour is discovered dead. He sees this as a bad omen and ends his relationship with Julie without explanation. Julie is furious and Clare's attempts to get them back together fail. Nigel regrets his decision but he finds it impossible to tell Julie how he feels as she is too busy organising her play. The play is performed and is a success. Depressed, Nigel shuns the after party, which saddens Julie as she is leaving for Scotland the next day and is unable to say goodbye. Just as her taxi is driving away, Nigel stops it, confesses his love to Julie and asks if he and Clare can come to Scotland with her and Josh. Julie agrees and comes to collect Nigel and Clare later, to begin their new life together as a family in Scotland. When Clare returns to Walford a decade later, in 2008, she reveals that Nigel and Julie are still happily together.

Character creation and development
Julie Haye was introduced in September 1997 as a love interest for the character Nigel Bates (played by Paul Bradley). Actress Karen Henthorn was cast in the role. Henthorn had previously auditioned to play the minor role of a pregnancy counsellor for the character Bianca Jackson (Patsy Palmer). She was not offered the part, but she was instead asked to audition for the much bigger role of Julie. Having been called back to Elstree Studios to discuss the role with the casting director, Henthorn was told that EastEnders were creating a new "semi-regular" character, Julie Haye, specifically as a love interest for Nigel Bates. Actor Paul Bradley, who played Nigel, had decided to leave the serial the following year, reportedly for fear of being typecast. As Nigel was "such a popular character", and because he had such an unsuccessful love live throughout the course of the show, the producers of EastEnders felt that the viewing public would not want him to have anything other than a "happy ending". "So Julie was being introduced as a vehicle for Nigel’s exit". Because the character Julie was in the process of being conceptualised, the casting director asked Henthorn to read through scenes from previous episodes of EastEnders between Nigel and his deceased wife, Debbie. The audition proved successful and they re-called Henthorn to read through some new scenes, which she had to learn for a screen test. Henthorn has commented, "this meeting was with the same director and two casting directors and took place on the Friday morning. I was offered the job that lunchtime!"

Henthorn has confessed to being a "fan" of EastEnders before she worked on it: "I could hardly contain myself the first time I actually saw Albert Square—‘in the flesh’. I ran all the way round the houses, up and down the steps, knocked on all the doors, peered through the windows of the Queen Vic, jumped around the garden and finally ended up sitting on Arthur's bench—exhausted and totally overwhelmed. It looked exactly the same as it does on the telly and everything is ‘real,’ apart from the buildings—there's nothing behind the walls!"

Viewers saw Nigel—dubbed "the Albert Square nerd"—fall in love with teacher Julie Hay as they tried to sort out his problematic stepdaughter, Clare (played by Gemma Bissix). In a plot twist, Julie was given a son named Josh, who had already formed a romance with Nigel's daughter Clare before his connection with Julie was revealed. Julie's son, Josh, was played by Jon Lee, who went on to find greater fame as a singer in the successful pop band, S Club 7.

A slow on/off romance develops between Nigel and Julie, which progresses into 1998 and eventually leads to the departure of both characters. Nigel is initially shown to struggle with the guilt of moving on following the death of his wife Debbie, who was killed in the serial in 1995 in a hit-and-run accident. Faced with Nigel's uncertainty, Julie makes plans to leave Walford for a teaching job in Scotland; however, moments before she leaves, Nigel changes his mind and opts to move to Scotland with her. The characters make their final appearances in April 1998. A source at the time said: "Nigel deserves a happy ending."

Actress Karen Henthorn has since reflected on her time in EastEnders: "I tried to keep an open mind regarding any expectations of the job. To be honest, I hadn’t got a clue what to expect. All I did know was that, because up until then, I, like the majority of actors, had spent years in and out of work (but mostly out). I had been struggling financially and creatively, had waited on more tables and pulled more pints than I care to remember. I was absolutely, without a shadow of a doubt, going to appreciate every single second, enjoy the whole experience. Which I did—whilst I was actually at work. But when I was away from the working environment, getting recognised in the street everywhere I went, being followed, pointed at, photographed, this was something I didn’t expect. And it happened overnight—one day, you can’t get anyone’s assistance in the supermarket, the next, they’re queuing up to carry your shopping home! Fame didn’t change me—it changed people round me. It was a very ‘interesting’ experience which took quite a while to get used to."

References

EastEnders characters
Television characters introduced in 1997
Female characters in television
Fictional schoolteachers